Patricia Garwood (28 January 1941 – 24 February 2019) was an English television, film and stage actress who first appeared on film aged 9 in The Lavender Hill Mob and is best known as playing Beryl Crabtree in five series of the BBC situation comedy No Place Like Home between 1983 and 1987.

Garwood was born in Paignton, Devon, on 28 January 1941. She was trained at the Arts Educational School and the Royal Academy of Dramatic Art. Garwood married in 1960 and had four daughters. Garwood died from non-Hodgkin lymphoma in February 2019 at the age of 78.

Filmography

Television appearances

References
Notes

Bibliography

External links
 

1941 births
2019 deaths
English film actresses
English television actresses
People from Paignton
People educated at the Arts Educational Schools
Alumni of RADA
Actresses from Devon
20th-century English actresses